Ted R. Provost (born July 26, 1948, in Navarre, Ohio) is a former star high school, university and professional football player.

As a high school athlete at Fairless High School he lettered three seasons as a quarterback and defensive back. He was also outstanding in basketball and track. He was inducted into the Stark County High School Football Hall of Fame in 2004.

Provost attended the Ohio State University and was a Buckeye from 1967 to 1969. He was key member of the 1968 national championship team as a safety. He was nicknamed "Tree" by legendary coach Woody Hayes after he collected so many of the "leaf" awards that were put on players helmets. The name did not come from his 6-foot 3 inch and 185 pound size. He was twice an All Big Ten all star (1968 and 1969) and was an All-American in 1969. His career interception total at Ohio State still ranks third all time  He was inducted into the Ohio State Varsity O Hall of Fame in 2006.

He was drafted by the National Football League's Los Angeles Rams in the 7th round (162nd overall) of the 1970 NFL Draft but was later traded to the Minnesota Vikings. He played 7 games with Minnesota in 1970 and 2 games with the St. Louis Cardinals in 1971.

Provost continued as a professional with the Saskatchewan Roughriders of the Canadian Football League, playing five seasons from 1972 to 1977. He was twice named an All-West Division all-star.

Ted Provost was successful after his football career, owner of Ted Provost Builders, a construction company in Hilliard, Ohio. He and his wife 2nd wife Ruth have three children, Michael, Douglas, and Molly.

On September 24, 2010, Mr. Provost was inducted into the Fairless High School Hall of Honor.

Notes

1948 births
Living people
American football defensive backs
American players of Canadian football
Canadian football defensive backs
Ohio State Buckeyes football players
People from Navarre, Ohio
Players of American football from Ohio
Saskatchewan Roughriders players
People from Hilliard, Ohio